Tourne Case or Tourne-Case is an historical French tables game in the same family as Backgammon. Lalanne recommends it as a children's game.

Some sources suggested that the name originated in the fact that a counter that was 'hit' had to be returned (retourner) to the box (case) or Trictrac table. However, Fallavel suggests it is more likely to mean "Point of Three" i.e. refers to the final point on which three counters must be placed to win.

History 
The game is mentioned by Rabelais in Gargantua in 1532 and its rules are recorded in French games compendia from the end of the 17th century to the late 19th century. A variant called La Course en Ligne Droite is also recorded in the late 20th century.

Equipment 
Like all tables games, Tourne Case requires a tables board made up of two rows of twelve points in the shape of triangles, three counters called pieces or men for each player, as well as two dice cups and two dice. The board used to be known in France as a Trictrac board or just a Trictrac.

Principle 
The players move their men in parallel, each on one side of the board, aiming to get them to the last point – the 'home point' or 'rest corner' (coin de repos) – and thus win the game.

An originality of the game is that you have to roll two dice, but only play the lower one. This changes the probabilities: out of the 36 possible throws, there are 11 for the ace, 9 for two, 7 for three, 5 for four, 3 for five and only one for six. The lower numbers are more likely to occur than the higher ones and it is therefore more difficult to move bring a man to the home point than if a single die were used. In addition, it introduces an element of tactics in that the closer a man is to an objective the more chance there is of reaching it.

Rules 
The following rules are based on those published by Fallavel (1715):

Each player has three counters or 'men' placed outside the board at the same end or on the same end rail. There are no men on the board itself at the start. 

Players roll the dice to decide who goes first. The dice were meant to be thrown hard against the opponent's rail.

In turn, players roll two dice and advance a man on their side by a number of points equal to the lower of the two dice. The higher die is never used. Movement is subject to the following restrictions:
 Two men may not occupy the same point.
 One man may not pass over another.
 If a man arrives on a point directly opposite an opposing man, the latter is 'hit' and is sent back off the board to its starting position.
 A man cannot go beyond the last point: it must reached the home point by the exact number of pips on the die.

It is compulsory to play if possible, but if no move can be made, it is forfeited and the turn passes to the opponent.

A man occupying the home point cannot be hit. The home point is the only one that may be occupied by more than one man. The winner is the first to bring his three men to the home point.

La Course en Ligne Droite 
Lêchalet (1979) publishes a variant under the name La Course en Ligne Droite ("Straight Line Race") with the following differences:

 Players only use one die each. This affects the game play in that, now, all numbers thrown have an equal probability.
 There is no restriction on men overtaking one another.
 There is no restriction on the number of men per point.
 A player failing to throw the exact score to finish must return the man to the start (i.e. off the board).

See also 
 Tables games

Footnotes

References

Literature 
 _ (1698), Le Jeu du Trictrac, 1st edn. Paris: Charpentier.
 Bell, R.C. (1975). Discovering Backgammon. Haverfordwest: Shire. 
 Bell, R.C. (1979). Board and Table Games from Many Civilizations, revised edn. [Originally published in 1960 in 2 volumes as Board and Table Games by OUP] NY: Dover. 
 Fallavel, M.J.M.F. (1715). Le Jeu du trictrac, Enrichi De Figures Avec les Jeux du Revertier, du Tourne-Case, des Dames Rabatues, du Plain, et du Toc. 3rd revised, corrected and expanded edn. Paris: Charpentier, pp. 63–77.
 Lêchalet, Jacques (1987) Le Jacquet, Le Backgammon, Le Tric Trac, Le Solitaire, 2nd edn. (1st edn. 1979), Bornemann. 55 pp.

External links 
 
 Le Tourne-case at Backgammon Galore!

Board games
Games of chance
Historical tables games
16th-century board games